Emiliano Gómez Dutra (born 18 September 2001) is a Uruguayan professional footballer who plays as a forward for Boston River, on loan from Italian club Sassuolo. He was included in The Guardians "Next Generation 2018", alongside compatriot and teammate Facundo Milán.

Club career
On 31 January 2020, he joined Italian club Sassuolo on loan with an option to purchase. On 11 September, after being bought outright by Sassuolo, he was loaned to Spanish Segunda División side Albacete Balompié for the season, being initially assigned to the reserves in Tercera División.

Career statistics

Club

Notes

References

External links

2001 births
Living people
Association football forwards
Uruguayan footballers
Uruguayan Primera División players
Defensor Sporting players
Boston River players
U.S. Sassuolo Calcio players
Segunda División players
Primera Federación players
Albacete Balompié players
Uruguay youth international footballers
Uruguayan expatriate footballers
Uruguayan expatriate sportspeople in Italy
Uruguayan expatriate sportspeople in Spain
Expatriate footballers in Italy
Expatriate footballers in Spain
Uruguay under-20 international footballers